The 2007 WNBA season was the 11th for the New York Liberty. The Liberty reached the playoffs, but they later fell to eventual conference champion Detroit Shock.

Offseason

Dispersal Draft
Based on the Liberty's 2006 record, they would pick 3rd in the Charlotte Sting dispersal draft. The Liberty picked Janel McCarville.

WNBA Draft

Regular season

Season standings

Season schedule

Playoffs

Player stats

Awards and honors
Janel McCarville, WNBA Most Improved Player Award

References

External links
Liberty on Basketball Reference

New York Liberty seasons
New York
New York Liberty